Berkovic is a Jewish-Ukrainian surname that may refer to: 

 Cecilia Berkovic, Canadian artist
 Eyal Berkovic (born 1972), Israeli football player
 Nir Berkovic (born 1982), Israeli football player
 Samuel Berkovic (born 1953), Australian neurologist

See also
 Berković
 Berkovich
 Berkovits

Jewish surnames
Ukrainian-language surnames